The Namaqualand Railway was a  narrow gauge railway operating between Port Nolloth and O'okiep in the Namaqualand region of the former Cape Colony in South Africa. It was originally a mule-drawn railway built to provide an outlet for the copper mines of the region. Although owned by the Cape Copper Company, the railway always operated as a public railway.

The railway pre-dated the construction of  railways in South Africa. Because of the success of the Namaqualand line,  gauge was strongly promoted by civil engineer R. Thomas Hall, Superintendent of the narrow gauge Redruth and Chacewater Railway in Cornwall who was involved in the construction of the Namaqualand Railway, as the primary gauge for railway construction in South Africa. The final decision was a compromise between the two recommended gauges and the  came into existence in Africa.

After copper mining ceased in 1928 the railway was temporarily closed until 1937 when mining activities resumed.

The Namaqualand Railway finally closed in 1944.

Locomotives 
 Namaqualand 0-4-0WT Condenser
 Namaqualand 0-4-2IST Caledonia
 Namaqualand 0-4-2ST Pioneer
 Namaqualand 0-4-2T Britannia
 Namaqualand 0-6-0T 1871
 Namaqualand 0-6-2 Clara Class
 Namaqualand 0-6-2 Scotia Class

References 

2 ft 6 in gauge railways in South Africa
Transport in the Northern Cape